John Franklin "Smiling Jack" Wiley (April 18, 1920 – March 25, 2013) was an American football player and coach. He played professionally a tackle for the Pittsburgh Steelers of the National Football League (NFL) from 1946 to 1950. Willey served as the head football coach at his alma mater, Waynesburg College—now known as Waynesburg University—in Waynesburg, Pennsylvania, from 1951 to 1954, compiling a record of 22–9–1.

Playing career and miltitary service
Wiley played college football as a tackle at Waynesburg College—now known as Waynesburg University—in Waynesburg, Pennsylvania and appeared in the 1939 Waynesburg vs. Fordham football game, the first televised American football game. His three older brothers—Robert, Asa, and Bill—also played football as Waynesburg. The youngest Wiley brother graduated from Waynesburg in 1941. He served in the United States Army during World War II, attaining the rank of captain.

After World War II, Wiley played for the Pittsburgh Steelers of the National Football League (NFL) from 1946 to 1950, under head coaches Jock Sutherland and John Michelosen.

Coaching career
Wiley was the head football coach at his alma mater, Waynesburg, for four seasons, from 1951 to 1954, compiling a record of 22–9–1.

Wiley left Waynesburg to become an assistant at Pitt, where he is credited with recruiting Mike Ditka and Marty Schottenheimer.

Late life and death
Waynesburg left coaching in 1961 to become a salesman and later regional manager for the L.G. Balfour Jewelry & Taylor Publishing Company. He died on March 25, 2013, in Rock Hill, South Carolina.

Head coaching record

References

External links
 

1920 births
2013 deaths
American football tackles
Pittsburgh Panthers football coaches
Pittsburgh Steelers players
Waynesburg Yellow Jackets football coaches
Waynesburg Yellow Jackets football players
United States Army officers
United States Army personnel of World War II
People from Greene County, Pennsylvania
Coaches of American football from Pennsylvania
Players of American football from Pennsylvania
Military personnel from Pennsylvania